Duran Creek (also spelled Duren Creek) is a stream in Benton County in the U.S. state of Missouri. It is a tributary of Cole Camp Creek.

Duran Creek was named after Mannen Duren, an early settler.

See also
List of rivers of Missouri

References

Rivers of Benton County, Missouri
Rivers of Missouri